The 1999 Zamfara State gubernatorial election occurred on January 9, 1999. APP candidate Ahmad Sani Yerima won the election, defeating PDP candidate.

Results
Ahmad Sani Yerima from the APP won the election. PDP and AD candidates contested in the election.

The total number of registered voters in the state was 1,113,426, total votes cast was 475,296, valid votes was 431,375 and rejected votes was 43,921.

Ahmad Sani Yerima, (APP)- 265,529

PDP- 161,904

AD- 3,942

References 

Zamfara State gubernatorial election
Zamfara State gubernatorial election

1999